Terellia vectensis is a species of tephritid or fruit flies in the genus Terellia of the family Tephritidae.

Distribution
United Kingdom, Spain, Switzerland, Italy, Cyprus, Israel, Ukraine.

References

Tephritinae
Insects described in 1937
Diptera of Europe